Wauzeka may refer to a town or a village in Crawford County, Wisconsin:

 Wauzeka (town), Wisconsin
 Wauzeka (village), Wisconsin